Limoncocha National Biological Reserve is a nature reserve is located 229 miles from Quito, Ecuador. The reserve includes over 13,000 acres (53 km2) of land in the Shushufindi Canton, Sucumbíos Province.

Fauna
There is a large concentration of Fauna in and around the reserve. The over 347 species of bird that live in the reserve make Birdwatching very popular attraction. Limoncocha also holds a large number of tortoises and a diverse population of fish.

Flora
The park is a largely water environment so a large portion of the Flora in the Nature reserve is either aquatic or semi-aquatic in nature. As with much of Ecuador towering trees provide homes for hundreds of types of animals. The microscopic algae in the water gives it a lemongreen color.

Attractions
Much of the reserve is a lagoon style landscape that was formed by the ancient course of the Napo River. A small community of Quichua also live in the Reserve.

See also
List of national parks in Ecuador

References 
 ambiente.gob.ec

Nature reserves in Ecuador
Geography of Sucumbíos Province
Educational institutions established in 1998
1998 establishments in Ecuador